Mr. Lemons is the third full-length album by singer/songwriter Glen Phillips.  It was released in May 2006 and features a cover of the Huey Lewis and the News hit, "I Want a New Drug".

To promote the album, the first 1700 pre-orders from the Aware Records online store were autographed by Phillips. Artwork for the album was done by Phillips' wife, Laurel.

Track listing
 "Everything But You" – 3:32
 "Blind Sight" – 3:49
 "Thank You" – 4:12
 "I Still Love You" – 4:00
 "Last Sunset" – 3:13
 "I Want a New Drug" – 3:18
 "Marigolds" – 2:29
 "Waiting" – 3:21
 "Didn't Think You Cared" – 2:29
 "The Next Day" – 4:11
 "A Joyful Noise" – 5:21

References

Glen Phillips albums
2006 albums